Aracne is an Italian publishing company, founded in 1993 by Gioacchino Onorati and specialized in academic and scientific literature.

It is the only Italian publishing company that does not require exclusive rights for its publications.
Aracne publishes both paper books and ebooks, most of them in Italian, although a considerable number of works is published in English. It uses the peer review as an evaluation system.

Aracne is a member of the programme for the Evaluation of the Quality of Research of the ANVUR, institution of the  Italian Ministry of Education, Universities and Research.

Reinhold Baer Prize

The Reinhold Baer Prize  is a mathematics award, annually granted jointly by the no-profit association AGTA - Advances in Group Theory and Applications and Aracne for outstanding
PhD theses or research article in group theory and its applications. The award is named after the German algebraist Reinhold Baer. 

The laureate is presented with a pecuniary prize of EUR1,000.

The first premiere took place during the international conference Advances in Group Theory and Applications 2017, held in Lecce (Italy) from  September 5th to 8th, 2017.

Laureates 

 Institutions mentioned above refer to the institutions where the laureates obtained their PhD.

References

External links
 Official site

Publishing companies established in 1993
Publishing companies of Italy
Mass media in Rome
Companies based in Rome